John Keaton Buckley (born 13 October 1999) is an English professional footballer who plays as a midfielder for  side Blackburn Rovers.

Career

Blackburn Rovers
Born in Manchester, Greater Manchester, Buckley joined the academy of then Premier League club Blackburn Rovers at the age of 6 in 2006. He signed his scholarship with Rovers in June 2015 before agreeing to his first professional contract on 26 January 2018, agreeing a deal that would run until 30 June 2020.

On 1 March 2019, Buckley signed a new three-year-deal with Blackburn which would run until 30 June 2022. Just over two weeks later, Buckley made his professional debut for Blackburn on 16 March, with the club being defeated 4-2 in its EFL Championship fixture against Sheffield Wednesday.

On 2 November, Buckley scored the first senior goal of his career in his club's 2-1 win against Sheffield Wednesday at Ewood Park. His first goal came against the very same club the player had made his professional debut against at the beginning of the year.

On 8 March 2020, Buckley received the first red card of his professional career, with the youngster being sent off in the 93rd minute against Derby County. In his first full season with the club's first-team, Buckley made 23 competitive appearances for Blackburn, scoring twice.

Career statistics

References

English footballers
1999 births
Living people
Association football midfielders
Blackburn Rovers F.C. players
English Football League players